Raatikainen is a Finnish surname. Notable people with the surname include:

August Raatikainen (1874–1937), Finnish farmer and politician
Jaska Raatikainen (born 1979), Finnish musician
Jussi Raatikainen (1898–1978), Finnish journalist and politician
Sami Raatikainen, Finnish musician

Finnish-language surnames